The 2021–22 season was St Johnstone's ninth season in the Scottish Premiership and their 13th consecutive season (following four in the former Scottish Premier League) in the top flight of Scottish football. The club also competed in the Scottish Cup, the League Cup, and the UEFA Europa League, having won both domestic cups the previous season.

Under the continued management of Callum Davidson, St Johnstone were confident of building upon the previous season's success but the departures of some key players left the team in transition and results through the autumn of 2021 were poor. Avoiding relegation became the priority and Saints were ultimately successful in that, although they finished eleventh (out of twelve) and had to overcome the challenge of Caley Thistle in the two-leg Premiership playoff. There were hopes that the team might retain the League Cup as they reached the semi-final but they went down by a single goal to eventual winners Celtic. Saints fared less well in the Scottish Cup, losing on their first appearance to League Two club Kelty Hearts.

In Europe, Saints played in the UEFA Europa League against Galatasaray and the inaugural UEFA Europa Conference League against Linzer ASK. They played well away from home to gain draws in the first legs of both these matches, only to be well beaten at home in the second leg.

Season summary
Still managed by Callum Davidson, St Johnstone hoped to build upon their double success in the 2020–21 domestic cup competitions. The team underwent some changes, however, particularly the departures of Jason Kerr and Ali McCann in August 2021. In the league, the team struggled to avoid relegation and eventually finished eleventh, six points adrift of Aberdeen in tenth place but six points clear of bottom club Dundee, who were automatically relegated.

By finishing eleventh, St Johnstone had to take part in the Premiership playoff where they met Inverness CT over two legs (home and away). The first leg was played at Caley Thistle's Caledonian Stadium on 20 May and ended in a 2–2 draw after Saints had led 2–0 at half-time. In the home leg at McDiarmid Park three days later, Saints were clear winners by 4–0, the team's biggest victory of the whole season. They thus won the playoff with a 6–2 aggregate to retain Premiership status in the 2022–23 season.

Hoping to repeat their domestic cup successes of the previous season, Saints reached the semi-final of the League Cup with victories over Arbroath and Dundee. They met Celtic in the semi-final at Hampden Park on 20 November and lost 1–0 to the eventual tournament winners. The defeat by Celtic ended an 11-game unbeaten run by Saints in domestic cup football. Saints entered the Scottish Cup in the fourth round with an away tie at League Two club Kelty Hearts, who had been newly promoted to the SPFL that season. The match was played at New Central Park on 22 January before a full house of 2,183. Having been goalless at full time, the match went into extra time and Kelty achieved a surprise victory over the cupholders with a goal in the 103rd minute.

St Johnstone's domestic cup wins in 2020–21 qualified the team for the 2021–22 UEFA Europa League. They joined the competition in the third qualifying round with a two-legged tie against Galatasaray. The first leg was played in Istanbul on 5 August. Saints took the lead after 58 minutes with a penalty goal by Jason Kerr, who left the club soon afterwards. Two minutes later, Sacha Boey equalised for Galatasaray and the match ended 1–1. The second leg was played in Perth on 12 August and attracted a crowd of 9,106, the highest attendance of the season at McDiarmid Park. Saints played well with a hard-fought performance but were overcome by three second half goals which consigned them to a 4–2 defeat (5–3 aggregate). The defeat meant Saints could enter the inaugural UEFA Europa Conference League which they joined in the playoff round with a tie against Austria's Linzer ASK (aka LASK). The matches were on 19 and 26 August. In the first leg at the Wörthersee Stadion, Saints drew 1–1 after taking a 17th minute lead with a goal by Chris Kane. As with Galatasaray, however, the home leg ended in defeat. Both David Wotherspoon and Shaun Rooney were sent off. Linz scored twice in the last twenty minutes to win 2–0 and take the tie 3–1 on aggregate.

Following the Premiership playoff victory over Caley Thistle which ended the season, Callum Davidson commented that Saints "have a lot of work to do" to compete with the best in 2022–23 and "need to make sure we're up competing just to stay in the league". He pointed out that many of the rival clubs "are spending money", including newly promoted Kilmarnock.

Competitions

Scottish Premiership

Premiership play-off

Scottish League Cup

Scottish Cup

UEFA Europa League

Third qualifying round

UEFA Europa Conference League

Play-off round

Squad statistics

Appearances

|-
! colspan=16 style=background:#dcdcdc; text-align:center| Departures

|}

Team statistics

League table

Results by round

Overall record

Transfers

In

Out

See also
List of St Johnstone F.C. seasons

References

St Johnstone F.C. seasons
St Johnstone
2021–22 UEFA Europa League participants seasons
2021–22 UEFA Europa Conference League participants seasons